The 2012 Congressional election in the Northern Mariana Islands was held on November 6, 2012 to elect the territory's sole Delegate to the United States House of Representatives. Representatives and non-voting Delegates are elected for two-year terms.

Delegate Gregorio Sablan, an independent who caucuses with the Democratic Party, has held the seat since its creation in 2008. Sablan won re-election in the 2008 four-person race with 43%, or 4,896 of the 11,325 total votes cast. He is the first non-voting delegate to represent the Northern Mariana Islands in the U.S. House of Representatives.

Sablan launched his re-election campaign for a third term on August 24, 2011.

Republican Party leaders in the Northern Mariana Islands, including Governor Benigno Fitial, had reportedly encouraged John Gonzales to run against Sablan in the race. Gonzales, a former Covenant Party member and the executive director of the Northern Mariana Islands public library system, previously finished in 3rd place in the 2008 United States House of Representatives election in the Northern Mariana Islands.

Candidates
Declared
Gregorio Sablan (Independent), incumbent Delegate
Dr. Ignacia Tudela "Acha" Demapan (Republican), Elementary School Principal
Declined
John Gonzales (R), 2008 Independent Candidate for Delegate

General election results
Incumbent Del. Gregorio "Kilili" Sablan won a landslide re-election, earning more than 7,000 votes more than his Republican challenger, Dr. Ignacia "Acha" Demapan, the largest vote margin of any political candidate in Northern Mariana Islands history.

See also
United States House of Representatives election in the Northern Mariana Islands, 2010

References

2012 Northern Mariana Islands elections
Northern Mariana Islands
2012